"So Close, So Far" is the second single by the post-grunge band Hoobastank from their fourth studio album For(n)ever. In interviews, Doug Robb stated that he "wrote the song about the many men and women across the world fighting to keep peace and fighting for America. It's how I would feel if I was away from them fighting a war".

Critical reception
The song received a positive review from Chuck Taylor of Billboard Magazine:

Charts

References

2009 singles
Hoobastank songs
2009 songs
Island Records singles
Songs written by Dan Estrin
Songs written by Doug Robb